Ommanney Glacier is a valley glacier, 20 nautical miles (37 km) long, meandering northward in the Admiralty Mountains to discharge into Relay Bay, on the west side of Robertson Bay, along the north coast of Victoria Land. Charted by the British Antarctic Expedition, 1898–1900, under C.E. Borchgrevink, who named it for Admiral Sir Erasmus Ommanney, who had served in the Arctic Expedition of 1850.

Glaciers of Pennell Coast